Miln is a surname. Notable people with the surname include:

 Barnaby Miln (born 1947), British social activist and former magistrate
 George Crichton Miln (1850–1917), American Unitarian pastor and Shakespearean actor
 James Miln (1819–1881), Scottish antiquary who excavated many sites around Carnac in Brittany
 Louise Jordan Miln (1864–1933), American novelist, wife of George C. Miln

See also
 Milne (surname)
 Milner (surname)